The textile bleaching (or bleaching of textiles) is one of the steps in the textile manufacturing process. The objective of bleaching is to remove the natural color for the following steps such as dyeing or printing or to achieve full white. All raw textile materials, when they are in natural form, are known as 'greige' material. They have their natural color, odor and impurities that are not suited to clothing materials. Not only the natural impurities will remain in the greige material, but also the add-ons that were made during its cultivation, growth and manufacture in the form of pesticides, fungicides, worm killers, sizes, lubricants, etc. The removal of these natural coloring matters and add-ons during the previous state of manufacturing is called scouring and bleaching.

A continuous bleaching range is a set of machines to carry out bleaching action. It consists of several compartments in which fabric moves from one side to another with the help of guide rollers and is treated with chemicals, heated, rinsed, and squeezed. Continuous bleaching is possible for the fabrics in open-width or rope form.

History 
Grassing is one of the oldest methods of bleaching textile goods. To bleach linen and cotton-based fabrics, the Grassing method has been used. Linen has long been bleached in Europe with Grassing method. The linens were laid out on the grass for over seven days after boiling with the ''lyes of ashes and rinsing''. Bleachfield was an open area to spread cloth, it was a field near watercourse used by a bleachery. Bleachfields were common in and around the mill towns during the British Industrial Revolution

Discovery of Chlorine 
After discovering Chlorine in the late 18th century, when chemical bleaching came into existence, the chemical bleaching rose above Grassing, as it was quicker and possible in indoors.

Scouring

Scouring is the first process carried out with or without chemicals, at room temperature or at suitable higher temperatures with the addition of suitable wetting agents, alkali and so on. Scouring removes the impurities such as waxes, pectins and makes the textile material hydrophilichy or water absorbent. Scouring is then followed by the bleaching process.

Bleaching
Bleaching is the process of decolorizing the material after it has been scoured. Bleaching textiles can be classified as oxidative bleaching and reductive bleaching which can be carried out with oxidizing and reductive bleaching agents. Bleaching agents attack the chromophores and alter the color absorbing properties of the objects.

Oxidative bleaching
Generally oxidative bleachings are carried out using sodium hypochlorite, sodium chlorite or sulfuric acid.

Vegetable fibres, animal fibers, and mineral fibres are the three major types of natural fibers. Natural fibers such as cotton, ramie, jute, wool, and regenerated fibers such as bamboo are all generally bleached with oxidative methods.

Oxygen bleaching action 
It is the conjugated double bonds of the substrate that makes the substrate capable of absorbing visible light. Hence, it looks yellower and need bleaching. When bleaching action carries out with oxygen, it removes the chromophoric sites and makes the cloths whiter. Oxygen is a degrading bleaching agent. Its bleaching action is based on ''destroying the phenolic groups and the carbon–carbon double bonds.''. The major source of chemical bleaching is Hydrogen peroxide  that contains  a single bond, (–O–O–). When this breaks down it gives rise to very reactive oxygen specie, which is the active agent of the bleach. Around sixty percent of the world Hydrogen peroxide is used in chemical bleaching of textiles and wood pulp.

Reductive bleaching
Reductive bleaching is done with sodium hydrosulphite, a powerful reducing agent. Fibres like polyamides, polyacrylics and polyacetates can be bleached using reductive bleaching technology.

Textile whitening 

Bleaching of textiles may include an additional application of optical brighteners (OBAs). Optical brightening agents are chemical compounds that absorb light in the ultraviolet and violet region (usually 340-370 nm) of the electromagnetic spectrum, and re-emit light in the blue region (typically 420-470 nm) by fluorescence. After scouring and bleaching, optical brightening agents are applied to make the textile material appear a more brilliant white. These OBAs are available in different tints such as blue, violet and red.

Whiteness 

Whiteness in colorimetry is the degree to which a surface is white. The term "whiteness" refers to the degree to which a surface resembles the properties of a perfect reflecting diffuser, i.e. an ideal reflecting surface that neither absorbs nor transmits light, but instead reflects it evenly in all directions.

CIE Whiteness 
CIE Whiteness is a formula that measures the degree of whiteness. The CIE Whiteness Index is a measure or methodology developed by  the Commission on illumination.

Gallery

See also 

 White
Dyeing
 Color of clothing
Color temperature

References

External links

  Textile Processing Guide at thesmarttime.com

Textiles
Industrial processes
Textile techniques